Elections to the Ross and Cromarty District Council took place in May 1992, alongside elections to the councils of Scotland's various other districts.

Aggregate results

The Labour candidate was elected unopposed

References

1992 Scottish local elections
Ross and Cromarty District Council elections